Rick Dickinson (c. 1957 – 24 April 2018) was a British industrial designer who developed pioneering computer designs in the 1980s. Notable examples of his design work include the ZX81 case and touch-sensitive keyboard and the ZX Spectrum's rubber keyboard.

Early life
Dickinson graduated from Newcastle Polytechnic in 1979 with a First Class Bachelor of Arts honours degree in Design for Industry. The "Design for Industry" degree was the first of its kind, formerly a three-year "Industrial Design" degree. The new course, with two additional terms for industrial placements, extended the degree to four years and popularised the term "sandwich course".

Sinclair
Dickinson joined Sir Clive Sinclair's Sinclair Research Ltd in December 1979, replacing John Pemberton who was leaving Sinclair to head up a new design centre for ITT in Harlow. Sinclair Research offices were at 6 Kings Parade, Cambridge.

Dickinson was the in-house industrial designer of Sinclair Research Ltd. He saw John Pemberton's design for the ZX80 case through to completion and designed a memory expansion. He went on to design the ZX81, including its touch-sensitive keyboard, a "clear step forward" in home computer design. In the rubber keyboard for the ZX Spectrum, he replaced the hundreds of components of a conventional keyboard with a design using "maybe four or five moving parts". Along with its colour display, engineered by Richard Altwasser, and commercialisation by Sir Clive Sinclair, the Spectrum popularised home computing, coding and gaming. Dickinson also designed the TV80 casing and Sinclair QL.

The ZX81 won a British Design Council award in 1981. It won a Haus Industrieform award and is in a permanent collection in Essen. The Sinclair QL won an Italian design award at the Smau Industrial Design Award.

Post-Sinclair
In 1986, he founded Dickinson Associates, an industrial design consultancy based in Cambridge. That year he produced the industrial design for an early laptop computer, the Cambridge Z88. In 1987 he was commissioned by Alan Sugar to create the industrial design concept for Amstrad's first portable computer.

In 1989, Dickinson, Christopher Curry (Acorn Computers), and Keith Dunning re-thought the MacArthur field microscope and Dickinson designed the Lensman microscope, a portable field microscope. In 1990–91 the Lensman microscope won the BBC design awards, The Prince Of Wales Award For Industrial Innovation And Production, and the Archimedes award for Engineering Excellence.

Dickinson met Apple founder Steve Jobs numerous times as they shared ideas for the MacBook in 1994.

He produced the industrial design concepts and models of the first "Broad Band phone" for AT&T. Dickinson Associates created the industrial design, mechanical design, and production engineering design for the first GSM mobile phone "reference phone" design, for Rockwell. Dickinson Associates were also the designers of the Gizmondo handheld console (originally the Gametrac).

In 2014, he published concept designs for modern Sinclair microcomputers. The following year, Dickinson published a series of images of the ZX Spectrum Next re-imagining the original Spectrum design. In 2016, he designed a wireless patch for a medical system to allow expectant mothers to monitor fetal heart rates. He also worked on the design of the ZX Spectrum Vega+ handheld games console. The first ZX Spectrum Next was delivered in February 2020.

Personal life and death
Dickinson had two daughters, Grace and Daisy, with his first wife Kim. He is survived by them and by his second wife Elizabeth ("Lizzy").

Dickinson died on 24 April 2018 while in Texas receiving further treatment for cancer first diagnosed in 2015.

See also 
 List of English inventors and designers

References

External links
 Rick Dickinson interview: The Enigma of Design Part 1, Part 2 and Part 3
 Rick Dickinson interview: Designer Update Part 1 and Part 2
 Planet Sinclair – Rick Dickinson
 Sinclair User magazine, Modest award winner sets the pace in micro design, August 1982
 Patents: ZX80, ZX81 and ZX Spectrum
 The Brits Who Designed the Modern World Artsnight – Series 4: 7, BBC Two

1950s births
2018 deaths
British industrial designers
British inventors
Sinclair Research
Deaths from cancer in Texas
Alumni of Northumbria University
Product designers
Year of birth uncertain